Craig Cozart is an American baseball coach and former player. He played college baseball at UCF from 1993 to 1996. He then served as the head coach of the UCF Knights (2008) and High Point Panthers (2009–2021).

Playing career
Cozart played at UCF under head coach Jay Bergman from 1993 to 1996.  He was drafted twice, in the 42nd round by the Braves after his junior season and in the 28th round by the Giants after his senior season, but decided not to pursue a professional career.  He earned his bachelor's degree from UCF in December 1996.

Coaching career

UCF
Cozart began his coaching career under Bergman immediately after graduating, serving as a student assistant in 1997. In 1998, he became a full assistant coach, a position he held through the 2008 season.  From 1997 to 2007, the Knights appeared in five NCAA Tournaments.

Partway through the 2008 season, Bergman resigned amid accusations of sexually harassing a UCF equipment manager.  Cozart, by that point the associate head coach, served as the interim head coach for the final 12 games of the season.  In that stretch, the team went 4–8, winning a C-USA series against UAB and going 0–2 in the C-USA Tournament.

UCF hired Terry Rooney to replace Bergman following the season. Cozart was told the following day that his contract would not be renewed. Cozart said to media members after he learned the news, "Really the last two months have been a difficult time because of everything that has been involved. But to get the word that 16 years of your life has ended – it's hard to handle still. ... I want to stay in the game. I'm just in the process of figuring out what capacity that will be."

High Point
Cozart became the head coach at High Point ahead of the 2009 season, after Sal Bando Jr. resigned. From 2009 to 2014, High Point has had two 30-win seasons. It has finished as high as third in the Big South Tournament, doing so in 2010, 2012, and 2014.

On June 2, 2021 High Point University announced that the university and Cozart had mutually agreed to, "a change in the leadership of the baseball program" effectively immediately.

Head coaching record
Below is a table of Cozart's records as a collegiate head baseball coach.

Notes

References

Living people
1974 births
High Point Panthers baseball coaches
UCF Knights baseball coaches
UCF Knights baseball players